Below is the List of Universities and Colleges in Zhejiang. As of April 2018, there were 108 higher education institutions and 9 continuing education institutions. As part of the Chinese education system, most universities and colleges in Zhejiang are public universities founded and run by the government, except for 36 private universities and colleges.

Military academies 
The Chinese People's Armed Police runs two academies in Zhejiang. People's Armed Police were part of the Ministry of Public Security, until it came under the Central Military Commission in January 2018. The China Coast Guard came under the Chinese People's Armed Police in July 2018. Since then, the two affiliated universities became part of the military system.

Public universities

Directly supervised by the central government 
The University of International Relations is a public university based in Beijing, under the Ministry of State Security. It was a National Key University. Its Hangzhou campus used to be Zhejiang Second Police College under the Ministry of State Security since 1983 before it was made the Hangzhou campus of the university in 1997. The campus has been training Tibetan students since 1983 and only recruits Tibetan students who are tested in Chinese in the National College Entrance Exam.

Zhejiang University was selected into China's national plan to develop first-class universities, namely Project 211, Project 985 and Double First Class University Plan, in 1995, 1999 and 2017, respectively. It was also a National Key University. As a university in the first batch of Project 985 universities, Zhejiang University is a member of C9 League. In 2000, Zhejiang University was made under the direct supervision of the Ministry of Education. The party secretary and president of Zhejiang University are regarded as vice ministerial government officials, whose nomination and approval are made by the Central People's Government and the Central Committee of the Chinese Communist Party. The university's Communist Party Committee and Commission for Discipline Inspection are under the Central Committee of the Chinese Communist Party and the Central Commission for Discipline Inspection respectively.

Co-founded by local and central governments

Degree education

Vocational education

Other provincial universities and colleges

Private universities

Degree education

Independent colleges 
Independent colleges are the private sector of public universities, which offers for-profit degree education for those who are not admitted to public universities. They were first set up in Zhejiang as a business model since the 1990s, yet a national reform has aimed to transform them into vocational or private universities independent of their affiliated universities since 2019. For example, Zhejiang University City College and Ningbo Institute of Technology, Zhejiang University were transformed into public universities, with the latter renamed as NingboTech University. The reform led to students' protests in 2021, after which the government suspended the reform. In Zhejiang, the reforms for Hangzhou Dianzi University Information Engineering School, Zhejiang Gongshang University Hangzhou College of Commerce, Zhijiang College of Zhejiang University of Technology had since been suspended.

Sino-foreign joint universities

Vocational education

Historical universities

Summary

By university town 
Following the foreign concept of the university town and the proposal by China Association for Promoting Democracy's Ningbo committee, the Ningbo Higher Education Park was built in 1999-2000 as the first higher education park in China. Since then, similar parks have been built in Zhejiang. Currently, the largest one is the Xiasha Higher Education Park, also named Qiantang Science Town, which is home to 14 higher education institutions and 200 thousand students. Below is the full list of the universities according to their university towns. 

 Ningbo Higher Education Park (South), Ningbo:
 Zhejiang Wanli University
 Zhejiang University (Ningbo Campus)
 NingboTech University
 University of Nottingham Ningbo China
 Ningbo College of Health Sciences
 Ningbo City College of Vocational Technology
 Zhejiang Pharmaceutical University
 Ningbo Higher Education Park (North), Ningbo:
 Ningbo University
 College of Science and Technology, Ningbo University
 Ningbo University of Technology
 Zhejiang Fashion Institute of Technology
 Xiasha Higher Education Park, Hangzhou: 
 Zhejiang University of Finance and Economics
 Zhejiang Gongshang University
 Hangzhou Normal University
 Hangzhou Dianzi University
 Zhejiang Sci-Tech University
 China Jiliang University
 Communication University of Zhejiang
 Zhejiang University of Water Resources and Electric Power
 Zhejiang Financial College
 Zhejiang Institute of Economics and Trade
 Zhejiang Technical Institute of Economics
 Zhejiang Police Vocational Academy
 Hangzhou Vocational and Technical College
 Zhejiang Yuying College of Vocational and Technology
 Xiaoheshan Higher Education Park, Hangzhou: 
 Zhejiang University of Technology
 Zhejiang University of Science and Technology
 Zhejiang International Studies University
 Zhejiang Changzheng Vocational and Technical College
 Binjiang Higher Education Park, Hangzhou: 
 Zhejiang Chinese Medical University
 Zhejiang Police College
 Hangzhou Medical School
 Zhejiang Changzheng Vocational and Technical College
 Zhejiang Vocational College of Commerce
 Zhejiang Vocational Academy of Art
 Xiaoshan Higher Education Park, Hangzhou: 
 Zhejiang Normal University
 Zhejiang College of Sports
 Zhejiang Tongji Vocational College of Science and Technology
 Tourism College of Zhejiang
 Zhejiang College of Construction

 Wenzhou Higher Education Mega Center, Wenzhou
 Wenzhou Medical University
 Wenzhou University
 Wenzhou Medical University Renji College
 Wenzhou Vocational and Technical College
 Wenzhou Business College
 Wenzhou-Kean University

By engagement in national higher education plans

By academic disciplines ranking

By administrative district

See also 
 List of universities in China
 Higher education in China

References

Notes 

List of Chinese Higher Education Institutions — Ministry of Education
List of Chinese universities, including official links
Zhejiang Institutions Admitting International Students

 
Zhejiang